William F. Shipley (November 19, 1921 – January 20, 2011) was an American linguist whose main area of research was the now-extinct Maidu language of Northern California. He was one of the last speakers of the language.

Life
Shipley was a student of anthropologist and linguist Alfred Kroeber, and linguist Mary Haas at UC Berkeley. During World War II, he was part of a program to teach US Army soldiers to speak Mandarin Chinese at Berkeley.

Shipley began studying the Mountain Maidu language in 1953 with Maym Benner Gallagher, a Maidu elder. He continued to work with Kenneth Holbrook to continue to document and record the Maidu language. Their collaboration led to a book of Maidu texts and dictionary. as well as a grammar of Maidu.

Shipley taught as a professor of linguistics at UC Santa Cruz from 1966 to 1991. After his retirement, he continued to work in spreading knowledge about the Maidu language and culture. His book of translated Maidu stories, The Maidu Indian Myths and Stories of Hánc'ibyjim, was published by Heydey Books in 1991. He died of complications from pneumonia on January 20, 2011. He was the father of screenwriter Michael Shipley.

References

External links
 Photographs of William Shipley from the UC Santa Cruz Library's Digital Collections

1921 births
2011 deaths
Academics from Oklahoma
Gay academics
Gay military personnel
Deaths from pneumonia in California
LGBT people from Oklahoma
Linguists from the United States
Linguists of Maiduan languages
Linguists of Penutian languages
Military personnel from Oklahoma
University of California, Berkeley alumni
University of California, Santa Cruz faculty
United States Army personnel of World War II